Joseph Francis Lamas (January 10, 1916 – April 22, 1996) was an American football player who played one season with the Pittsburgh Steelers of the National Football League.  He played college football at Mount St. Mary's University and attended Straubenmuller Textile High School in New York, New York.

Professional career
Lamas played in eight games for the Pittsburgh Steelers during the 1942 season. He scored a 29-yard fumble recovery touchdown against the Detroit Lions on November 8, 1942.

Coaching career
Lamas entered Iona Prep in 1952. He was the assistant football coach from 1952 through 1956 and took over the head coaching job from 1957 through 1961. He also coached baseball and worked as the athletic director. On the academic side, he taught Latin, history and health. Lamas retired from Iona Prep in 1979.

Military career
Lamas entered military service after the 1942 season and fought during World War II.

References

External links
 Just Sports Stats

1916 births
1996 deaths
20th-century American educators
American football guards
Cuban emigrants to the United States
Mount St. Mary's Mountaineers football players
Pittsburgh Steelers players
High school baseball coaches in the United States
High school football coaches in New York (state)
United States Army personnel of World War II
Sportspeople from Havana
Players of American football from New York City
Educators from New York City
Hispanic and Latino American teachers